All Over the Workplace is a British children's factual television series is a spin off of All Over the Place hosted by Alex Riley and narrated by Ed Petrie (who is the host of All Over the Place). The show is produced by CBBC Productions for CBBC and follows Riley taking two children (known as 'Rookies') to experience various jobs in the United Kingdom. Two series of 10 episodes each have been aired. Series 1 began on 7 March 2016, and series 2 began on 30 January 2017.

Format
In each episode, Riley takes two children to experience jobs in the United Kingdom. These have included authors, chefs and fashion designers. Throughout the episode, they meet professionals who give them their top tips. At the end of the episode, the professionals say whether they think the child would do well in that job when they are older.

Episodes

Series 1 (2016)

Series 2 (2017)

References

External links
 

2016 British television series debuts
2017 British television series endings
English-language television shows
British non-fiction television series
BBC Television shows
British television spin-offs
BBC children's television shows
Television series by BBC Studios